René Andring (born 11 September 1939) is a former Luxembourgian cyclist. He competed in the individual road race and team time trial events at the 1960 Summer Olympics.

References

External links
 

1939 births
Living people
Luxembourgian male cyclists
Olympic cyclists of Luxembourg
Cyclists at the 1960 Summer Olympics
People from Luxembourg (canton)